Burbridge Creek is a stream in the U.S. state of Missouri.

Burbridge Creek has the name of Jesse Burbridge, a pioneer settler.

See also
List of rivers of Missouri

References

Rivers of Monroe County, Missouri
Rivers of Ralls County, Missouri
Rivers of Missouri